The CTBC Brothers or simply Brothers are a professional baseball team in Taiwan. The team was originally established as an amateur team in 1984 by the Brother Hotel located in Taipei City, and later joined the Chinese Professional Baseball League (CPBL) in 1989. Brother Hotel's chairman Hung Teng-sheng also acted as CPBL's secretary-general from 1987 to 1991. The Brothers are currently owned by CTBC Holding.

With its long history from the amateur era plus a successful marketing strategy and management, the team has long been one of the most popular Taiwanese baseball teams, winning the CPBL championship on nine occasions.

The team has always worn yellow uniforms. Its current home is in Taichung, with the home field at the Taichung Intercontinental Baseball Stadium.

History 

On March 17, 1990, the Brother Elephants played the first historical CPBL game against the Uni-President Lions in the now-demolished Taipei Municipal Baseball Stadium with a full house of 14,350 in attendance. These two teams are also the only two remaining original teams of the CPBL.

Despite having the best season-long record for the 2004 season, the Elephants were unable to participate in the Taiwan Series because they had won neither half-season. This resulted in the expansion of the playoffs to three teams beginning in 2005, where the team with the best season-long record among non-champions for the season would gain a wildcard berth, thus preventing a similar occurrence in the future.

In mid-2008, general manager Hung Jui-he revealed the possibility of sale or disbanding of the organization if the financial deficit continued after 2009.

In the 2009 season, Brother Elephants were triumphant in winning the second half of the season. However, the team was affected deeply by the match fixing scandal which resulted in expulsion of many team players and the coach.

In October 2013, the team's president announced attempts to sell the team. The announcement drew interest from seven potential bidders. The team was sold to Hua Yi, a subdivision of CTBC Holding, by December 2013 for a price of NT$400 million. The team's name change reflected their new corporate parent, but it was felt that the branding from their previous owners was strong enough to rename the team Brothers, while retaining the elephant mascot. In 2022, the CTBC Holding officially purchased the team from Hua Yi.

Records

Regular seasons

Playoffs

Roster

Retired numbers

List of managers

Brother Elephants (1990–2013)

CTBC Brothers (2014–present)

Notes 
 First half-season champions
 Second half-season champions

References

External links 
  
  

Chinese Professional Baseball League teams
Baseball teams established in 1989
Sport in Taichung
1989 establishments in Taiwan